The 1966 Oregon gubernatorial election took place on November 8, 1966. Republican nominee Tom McCall defeated Democratic nominee Robert W. Straub to win the election.

Candidates

Democratic
 Robert W. Straub, State Treasurer

Republican
 Tom McCall, Secretary of State of Oregon

Election results

References

1966
Gubernatorial
Oregon
November 1966 events in the United States